Cameron Scott (born 4 January 1998) is an Australian cyclist, who currently rides for UCI WorldTeam .

Major results

Road
2018
 1st  Under-23 race, National Criterium Championships
 1st Stage 5 Tour of Qinghai Lake
 1st Stage 2 New Zealand Cycle Classic
2019
 1st Stage 4 Tour of the Great South Coast
 3rd Under-23 race, National Criterium Championships
2022
 1st Memorial Van Coningsloo
 1st Melbourne to Warrnambool Classic
 1st Stages 2 & 3 Tour of Gippsland
 2nd Ronde van Overijssel
 3rd National Criterium Championships

Track

2014
 Oceania Junior Championships
1st  Kilometer
1st  Team sprint
2nd  Keirin
2015
 UCI World Junior Championships
2nd  Team sprint
3rd  Kilometer
2016
 Oceania Championships
2nd  Madison
3rd  Team pursuit
 UCI World Junior Championships
2nd  Team sprint
3rd  Madison
2017
 1st Six Days of Melbourne (with Leigh Howard)
 3rd  Scratch, Oceania Championships
2018
 1st Team pursuit, Berlin, 2018–19 UCI World Cup
 National Championships
2nd Madison (with Sam Welsford)
3rd Kilometer
 3rd  Scratch, Oceania Championships
2019
 1st  Team pursuit, UCI World Championships
 2nd Team pursuit, Cambridge, 2019–20 UCI World Cup
 2nd Six Days of Melbourne (with Sam Welsford)
 3rd Madison (with Leigh Howard), National Championships

References

External links

1998 births
Living people
Sportspeople from Wagga Wagga
Australian male cyclists
Australian track cyclists
UCI Track Cycling World Champions (men)
20th-century Australian people
21st-century Australian people